Marquay Cottage is a historic cure cottage located at Saranac Lake, town of North Elba in Essex County, New York.  It was built in 1914 and is a rectangular -story dwelling of rusticated cast-concrete blocks with a gable roof and cross-gables. It features an octagonal corner tower with a pyramidal roof in the Queen Anne style.  It has a  cure porch.

It was listed on the National Register of Historic Places in 1992.

References

Houses on the National Register of Historic Places in New York (state)
Queen Anne architecture in New York (state)
Houses completed in 1914
Houses in Essex County, New York
National Register of Historic Places in Essex County, New York